

This is a list of the National Register of Historic Places listings in Prescott, Arizona.  It is intended to be a complete list of the properties and districts on the National Register of Historic Places in Prescott, Arizona, United States.  The locations of National Register properties and districts for which the latitude and longitude coordinates are included below, may be seen in an online map.

There are 132 properties and districts listed on the National Register in Yavapai County, including 1 that is also a National Historic Landmark. 65 of these properties and districts are located in the city of Prescott, and are listed here, while the remaining 67 properties and districts are located elsewhere in the county, and are listed separately.

Current listings

|}

Former listing

|}

See also

 List of National Historic Landmarks in Arizona
 National Register of Historic Places listings in Arizona

References

Prescott